Éva Orbán (born 29 November 1984 in Pápa) is a Hungarian hammer thrower. She set her personal best and a Hungarian national record with a throw of 71.33 metres on the 2011 Summer Universiade in Shenzhen, with that she won the silver medal of the event.

Achievements

Awards
 Hungarian athlete of the Year (3): 2011, 2012, 2013

References

1984 births
Living people
People from Pápa
Hungarian female hammer throwers
Athletes (track and field) at the 2004 Summer Olympics
Athletes (track and field) at the 2008 Summer Olympics
Athletes (track and field) at the 2012 Summer Olympics
Olympic athletes of Hungary
World Athletics Championships athletes for Hungary
Universiade medalists in athletics (track and field)
Universiade silver medalists for Hungary
Medalists at the 2011 Summer Universiade
Sportspeople from Veszprém County
21st-century Hungarian women